The Consulate General of Sweden is the diplomatic mission of Sweden in New York City. It is located at One Dag Hammarskjöld Plaza in Turtle Bay, Manhattan, near the headquarters of the United Nations.

History
Sweden has had a consulate in New York City since 1834. On 1 January 1914, the consulate was upgraded to a consulate general.

In 2010, the general consulate - a mission with about 25 employees, diplomats as well as local employees - was closed for budgetary reasons. In connection with this, the smaller Swedish honorary consulate general opened. Prime Minister Stefan Löfven announced in November 2014 that Sweden would re-open a general consulate in New York City, then no earlier than fall of 2015. On 29 October 2015, the Swedish government decided to upgrade the Swedish presence in New York City by opening a consulate general. The new mission was staffed by two people from the Ministry for Foreign Affairs and a number of local employees. On 27 January 2016, Sweden's new consulate general in New York City was inaugurated in a ceremony with, among others, Minister of Enterprise and Innovation Mikael Damberg, Sweden's new consul general Leif Pagrotsky, ambassador Björn Lyrvall, Deputy Commissioner Hillary Schrenell and outgoing honorary consul general David E.R. Dangoor.

Activities
The consulate general provides consular services to Swedes (for example, passport applications, name registration, application for coordination numbers, assistance to Swedes in an emergency) and helps Americans and other nationalities, including residence permit and visa applications. The consulate general also conducts Swedish promotion activities by supporting and marketing Swedish culture in the New York area, as well as promoting trade between Sweden and the United States, and stimulating foreign investment in Sweden. The consulate general's district includes the states of New York, New Jersey and Connecticut. The consulate general reports to the Embassy of Sweden, Washington, D.C.

Buildings

Office 
Until the closure in 2009, the consulate general's office was housed at One Dag Hammarskjöld Plaza, the intersection of the 48th Street and the Second Avenue, on the 45th floor. When the honorary consulate general opened in 2010, the office moved to 445 Park Avenue between 56th Street and 57th Street, for the reason that the honorary consul general David E.R. Dangoor already had offices in this building. After the upgrade to consulate general in December 2016, the consulate general's address became 445 Park Avenue until further notice. Since 2017, the office is again located at One Dag Hammarskjöld Plaza, but on the 40th floor.

Residence 
After World War II, the Swedish state looked for a residence building for the Swedish consul general. In 1946, the house at 600 Park Avenue was purchased for this reason. When the properties on 61-63 East 64th Street were for sale, the consulate were given the opportunity to make room for the consulate general and staff housing. This meant that a refurbishment of the interiors of the houses was necessary. The staff moved in during 1947. Shortly thereafter, the properties 604 and 608 Park Avenue were also acquired. The consulate general's business expanded considerably and in 1965 the Ministry for Foreign Affairs decided to move the office functions to more modern office premises.

The buildings have since 1981 been classified as "landmark", ie buildings with a historical value whose exteriors may not change. In 1984-85, the National Swedish Board of Public Building (Byggnadsstyrelsen), the National Property Board of Sweden's predecessor, carried out a thorough rebuilding of the four houses in order to achieve a functional housing for the consul general and as many apartments as possible. The construction work started in August 1984 and the houses were ready for occupancy in the fall of 1985. After the renovation, the properties had a total of 21 apartments, laundry rooms, storage rooms and a sauna. Well-known Swedish designers such as Carl Malmsten, Josef Frank, Carl-Axel Acking and Ingegerd Torhamn are represented in the interior. The works also included renovation of the facades.

The property, registered as 600, 604 and 608 Park Avenue and 61-63 East 64th Street, houses housing for Swedish personnel. In 2011-2013, the National Property Board of Sweden renovated the property after an ambitious care program with the aim of highlighting the cultural-historical values that were lost during previous renovations. The National Property Board of Sweden completed the major renovation of 600 Park Avenue with the renovation of adjacent facades and windows in 2014. For some time, the property was the residence of the Swedish UN ambassador.

Heads of Mission

References

Notes

Print

External links

 
Property on Park Avenue 

Diplomatic missions of Sweden
Diplomatic missions in Manhattan
Sweden–United States relations